{{DISPLAYTITLE:C9H12N2}}
The molecular formula C9H12N2 (molar mass: 148.20 g/mol, exact mass: 148.1000 u) may refer to:

 Nornicotine, also known as demethylnicotine
 4-Pyrrolidinylpyridine

Molecular formulas